Mammoth Screen is a UK-based production company that was established in 2007 by Michele Buck and Damien Timmer. It produces drama for key UK broadcasters, especially ITV, and international distribution. Others may be looking for Mammoth Pictures, a US-based production company.

ITV announced on 1 June 2015 that it had acquired Mammoth Screen, which is now part of ITV Studios.

Productions

North Korean hacking allegations
In October 2017 it was reported that an upcoming drama about a British nuclear scientist taken prisoner in North Korea, commissioned by Channel 4 and with the working title Opposite Number, had caused the production company's computer network to be targeted by North Korean hackers. The project was subsequently shelved.

References

External links 

 
Mammoth Screen on IMDb

ITV (TV network)
Mass media companies established in 2007
Television production companies of the United Kingdom
British companies established in 2007
2015 mergers and acquisitions